The tug of war contest at the 1912 Summer Olympics consisted of a single match, as only two teams entered the competition.

Sweden was represented by the Stockholm Police, while Great Britain's team consisted of five men from City of London Police and five from "K" (Stepney) Division of the Metropolitan Police, the gold and bronze medallists respectively at the last Summer Olympics.  Austria, Bohemia, and Luxembourg had all entered teams, but failed to appear.

The withdrawals of those three teams turned what had been planned as a 10-match round-robin tournament into a single-match bout between Sweden and Great Britain.  The bout consisted of a best-two-of-three contest. The competition was held on July 8, 1912. In the first pull, the Swedish team steadily pulled the British squad across the center mark.  After a five-minute break, the second pull was started.  In this one, neither team gained the victory through pulling the other across the line, but after a prolonged stalemate a couple of the London men succumbed to exhaustion and sat on the ground, disqualifying them and giving the Swedes the victory.

Medal summary

References

Sources

External links
 

 
1912 Summer Olympics events
1912
1912 in tug of war
History of the Metropolitan Police
History of the City of London Police